Jan Havlena (born 9 December 1998) is a Czech football player who plays for MFK Chrudim.

Club career
He made his professional debut in the Serie B for Entella on 1 October 2016 in a game against Vicenza. After three long injuries, latest an anterior cruciate ligament injury in January 2018, Havlena returned to the pitch in August 2018. However, he left Entella at the end of the season.

Ahead of the 2019-20 season, Havlena joined Bohemians 1905 to play for the club's B-team. He played three games for the club before leaving on 22 February 2020 to join MFK Chrudim.

References

External links
 

1998 births
Living people
People from Náchod
Czech footballers
Czech expatriate footballers
Virtus Entella players
MFK Chrudim players
Serie B players
Bohemian Football League players
Association football midfielders
Expatriate footballers in Italy
Czech expatriate sportspeople in Italy
Sportspeople from the Hradec Králové Region